Ahamadu Yakubu was a Nigerian born polo player.

Life
It is believed he was born somewhere between the late 1940s or mid-1950s in Batchama to Kaka Yakubu. At 4 he was working in the fields scaring away birds from the crops with a slingshot. At 11 he left home and worked from numerous Alhaji in and around Kaduna. He worked with horses mostly in the stables and gained a knowledge about these magnificent creatures like no one else.

During the 1970s Ahmadu established a successful construction and development company called Songhai Pty Ltd based in Kaduna. During the 1970s and 1980s Songhai Pty Ltd constructed major projects through Northern Nigeria for major commercial, industrial and  Government clients such as UNTL, Zamfara (Textiles), Peugeot Automobile Nigeria, Borno, Plateau, Kano, and Kaduna State Governments. During this period he was Captain of the Kaduna Polo Club, transforming it into a northern hub for the game and the venue for regional and international polo tournaments.

Once even beating Prince Charles he was praised to be the worlds "best black back" as this was his position in polo. He was diagnosed with prostate cancer and died in 1997. The Kaduna Polo Club was renamed the "Ahmadu Yakubu Polo Ground" after his death, and now renamed as HRH Kabir Usman Polo Ground in order to honor the then emir of Katsina state Alhaji Abdulmumini Kabir Usman

External links
IN NIGERIA, POLITICS AND POLO MEET AT THE CLUB

Year of birth missing
1997 deaths
Nigerian polo players